The 1980 Washington Huskies football team was an American football team that represented the University of Washington during the 1980 NCAA Division I-A football season.

Both regular season losses were at home at Husky Stadium. The sole conference loss was to border rival  who last defeated the Huskies in 1973; it was the first loss for James against a Northwest team. In his eighteen games against the Ducks, James lost only three; the other two were in 1987 and 1988. The Huskies' winning streak over Washington State in the Apple Cup reached seven with another win  it has not been held there since.

Senior quarterback  was selected as the team's most valuable player; Flick, Ken Gardner, Rusty Olsen, and Randy Van Divier were the

Schedule

Roster

Season summary

Air Force

Northwestern

Oregon

at Oklahoma State

at Oregon State

at Stanford

at USC

Navy

Arizona State

Arizona

at Washington State

Ken Gardner intercepted a Samoa Samoa pass with 1:05 remaining to preserve the win.

Rose Bowl (vs. Michigan)

NFL Draft selections
Five University of Washington Huskies were selected in the 1981 NFL Draft, which lasted twelve rounds with 332 selections.

References

External links
 Official game program: Washington vs. Washington State at Spokane – November 22, 1980

Washington
Washington Huskies football seasons
Pac-12 Conference football champion seasons
Washington Huskies football